Penpen de Sarapen was a former children's variety show aired on Radio Philippines Network every Saturday morning from 1987 to 2001. It was hosted by Connie Angeles together with Fred Moore delos Santos and Teena Cruz. The stage of Penpen de Sarapen was set in the atrium of Farmers Plaza in Araneta Center (now Araneta City), Cubao, Quezon City and then eventually moved to the RPN 9's local studio in Broadcast City, Quezon City. The show was basically an entertainment, game and story-telling show for children.

Host and artists
 Connie Angeles
 Camille Angeles
 Teena Cruz
 Fred Moore delos Santos
 Chris Guerrero as Islaw Kalabaw
 Assunta de Rossi
 Alessandra de Rossi
 Sunshine Dizon
 Sarah Geronimo
 Bea Nicolas
 Joy Isabel a.k.a. 'Ate Candy - Malalasahan Mo Kaya and Balitang C, Columbia Candy Segment'
 Cherie Gel Maglasang
 Pao Herrera
 Allan Quiocho - Kim Jeong Un
 Harry William Acosta a.k.a. Harry del Castillo
 Cindy Tiodianco
 Caselyn Francisco
 Camile Velasco
 Jennylyn Mercado
 Joyce Torresyap
 Kaye Baron
 Jaychris Osias
 Arwin "Antukin" Camasuela
 Erick "May Dating" Jade Azarcon
 Evan Dwight Salandanan
 Grechell Ann Silvestre
 Aia Camille Gutierrez Razon a.k.a. Regent Girl Dancer

See also
 List of programs previously broadcast by RPN 9

Philippine children's television series
1987 Philippine television series debuts
2001 Philippine television series endings
Radio Philippines Network original programming